Gary Glasberg (July 15, 1966 – September 28, 2016) was an American television writer and producer. He was born in New York City. He was the showrunner on NCIS and creator of NCIS: New Orleans.

Glasberg's production company is called When Pigs Fly Incorporated.

Career
Glasberg started out writing for animated shows such as Rugrats, Mighty Morphin Power Rangers, Aaahh!!! Real Monsters and Duckman. Glasberg's credits include The Street, Crossing Jordan, The Evidence, Bones, Shark, The Mentalist and NCIS. From 2011 until his death he was showrunner, and the producer in charge of day-to-day operations, on NCIS.

Screenwriting
 Rugrats (1992)
 Mighty Morphin Power Rangers (1993)
 Superhuman Samurai Syber-Squad (1994)
 Aaahh!!! Real Monsters (1994)
 Duckman (1995)
 Swift Justice (1996)
 L.A. Firefighters (1996)
 Viper (1997)
 Recess (1997)
 Ghost Stories (1997-1998)
 L.A. Doctors (1998)
 Mercy Point (1998)
 Good vs. Evil (1999)
 Cover Me (2000)
 The Street (2000)
 Crossing Jordan (2001-2004)
 The Evidence (2006)
 Bones (2006-2007)
 Shark (2007)
 The Mentalist (2008-2009)
 NCIS (2009-2016)
 NCIS: New Orleans (2014)

Producer
 Crossing Jordan (2001-2004)
 The Evidence (2006)
 Bones (2006-2007)
 Shark (2007-2008)
 The Mentalist (2008-2009)
 NCIS (2009-2017)
 NCIS: New Orleans (2014-2018)

Personal life
Glasberg was married to writer Mimi Schmir and had two sons.

Glasberg died in his sleep of unknown causes on September 28, 2016, in Los Angeles at the age of 50.

References

External links
 

1966 births
2016 deaths
Television producers from New York City
Place of birth missing
Showrunners
Writers from New York City
JAG (TV series)
NCIS (TV series)
Screenwriters from New York (state)
20th-century American screenwriters
20th-century American male writers
21st-century American screenwriters
21st-century American male writers
American television writers
American male television writers